Eagle Rock Entertainment is an international producer and distributor of music films and programming. It operates two record labels (Eagle Records and Armoury Records), a full-service production company (Eagle Rock Productions) and a music publishing subsidiary (Eagle-i Music).

History
Eagle Rock Entertainment was founded in April 1997 by Terry Shand, Geoff Kempin and Julian Paul, three former colleagues at Castle Communications, with capital coming from BMG. It was later acquired by Edel Records and in 2001 entirely sold to the British investment company HgCapital for £34 million. In 2007 a minority stake was re-acquired by Edel AG. The Eagle Vision division was established in 2000. Eagle Rock Entertainment's headquarters are in London with offices in New York and affiliate offices around the world. In April 2014, Eagle Rock Entertainment was acquired by Universal Music Group. Universal Music's purchase of Eagle followed that of much of EMI. Terry Shand continues to lead the company as chairman and CEO from its headquarters in London. In 2020, Universal Music established Mercury Studios which absorbed Eagle Rock Entertainment.

Awards
The company won a Grammy Award for The Doors documentary When You're Strange in 2010.

See also
List of record labels

References

External links
 

 
Record labels established in 1997
IFPI members
British record labels
Music publishing companies of the United Kingdom
Labels distributed by Universal Music Group